The Lubi-Lubi song is a traditional Filipino song that originally was a Waray folk song.

Common lyrics
Enero, Pebrero, Marso, Abril, Mayo,
Hunyo, Hulyo, Agosto,
Setyembre, Oktubre,
Nobyembre, Disyembre,
Lubi-lubi.

Halina at pag-aralan
Ngalan ng Labindalawang buwan
Ulit-ulitin natin bigkasin
Sabay-sabay nating awitin

Versions
There are at least twenty recordings of Lubi lubi. It is a traditional Filipino song. The song is used to help memorize the months of the year.

References

External links
Lubi-Lubi Song  Tagalog Months of the Year Song, robie317  via YouTube
Lubi-Lubi  Filipino Months of the Year Song 2020 Tagalog Kids Song, robie317  via YouTube
 Months Of The Year In Tagalog | English To Tagalog Translations (Philippine News)

Folk songs
Tagalog-language songs
Philippine folk songs